Thurman may refer to:

Places
In the United States:
Thurman, Indiana
Thurman, Iowa
Thurman, Kansas
Thurman, New York
Thurman, Ohio
Thurman Cafe, in Columbus, Ohio

People
Surname
Allen G. Thurman (1813–1895), American politician and vice-presidential candidate
Andrew Thurman (born 1991), American baseball player
Annie Thurman (born 1996), American actress
Arthur Thurman (1879–1919), American racecar driver
Arthur Thurman (footballer) (1874–1900), English footballer
Bob Thurman (1917–1998), American baseball player
Ernestine Hogan Basham Thurman (1920 - 1987), American entomologist and researcher
Howard Thurman (1899–1981), African American theologian and civil rights leader
Jameer Thurman (born 1995), American football player
James D. Thurman (born 1953), American general who commanded V Corps
John Thurman (disambiguation)
Karen Thurman (born 1951), U.S. Representative
Lucy Thurman (1849–1918), temperance activist and president of the National Association of Colored Women
Maxwell R. Thurman (1931–1995), United States Army General and Vice Chief of Staff
Mike Thurman (born 1973), American baseball player
Nick Thurman (born 1995), American football player
Odell Thurman (born 1983), NFL linebacker
Rob Thurman, contemporary American novelist
Robert Thurman (born 1941), American Buddhism scholar
Samuel Thurman  (1913–1995), American law professor
Sue Bailey Thurman (1903–1996), American author, historian and civil rights activist
Tony Thurman (born 1962), American football player
Uma Thurman (born 1970), American actress
Wallace Thurman (1902–1934), American novelist

Given name
Thurman Arnold  (1891–1969), American lawyer
Thurman C. Crook (1891–1981), U.S. Representative
Benjamin Thurman Hacker (1935–2003), U.S. Navy officer
Thurman "Fum" McGraw (1927–2000), American football player
Thurman Munson (1947–1979), American baseball player
Thurman Thomas (born 1966), American football player
Thurman Tucker (1917–1993), American baseball player

See also 
 Thurmann (disambiguation)
 Thurmond (disambiguation)